Tiszadob is a village in Szabolcs-Szatmár-Bereg county, in the Northern Great Plain region of eastern Hungary.

Geography

Nobility 
The families of notable Hungarian nobility that are known to have lived in Tiszadob, at some point in time between 1786 and 1895, include: Andrássy, Balogh, Batta, Doby, Görgei, Lakatos, Székes, Tóth and Zákány.

History 
Tiszadob and its surroundings were already inhabited before the conquest. During the excavations in the vicinity, traces of Bronze Age and Sarmatian cemeteries were discovered, and traces of the Csörsz ditch and an earthen castle were found on the outskirts of the village.

The first written trace of the settlement dates from 1220, the Oradea Register mentions it, and then there is a written trace from 1336. It was a royal estate for a long time and then the property of the Dob branch of the Gutkeled clan. In 1430 King Sigismund donated it to the diocese of Eger.

It has been among the estates of the Báthori family since 1588. From the end of the 17th century II. Ferenc Rákóczi and her sister, however, after the fall of the war of independence, this estate was confiscated from the Rákóczi family.

It was bought by Ferenc Károlyi in 1746, and then (through marriage) the village and its surroundings became the property of the Andrássy family. Count István Széchenyi made the first hoeing here in Tiszadob in 1846, symbolizing the beginning of the regulation of the Tisza. The participants of this famous event are reminded of the monument erected here by István Széchenyi, Gyula Andrássy and Pál Vásárhelyi.

The castle of Count Andrássy in Tiszadob id. It was built by Gyula Andrássy, the first foreign minister of the Austro-Hungarian Monarchy, between 1880-1885. The English garden behind the castle was also established at that time.

Count Sándor Andrássy, Member of Parliament, was the last owner of the castle and the huge estate. After 1945 the castle and the Andrássy estate were nationalized; The two sons of Sándor Andrássy, Count Imre Andrássy (1891-1985) and Count Mihály Andrássy (1893-1990) were forced to leave the country; the first died in the United States and the second in Canada. The area of the park of Andrássy Castle in Tiszadob decreased after the Second World War, currently 15 cadastral moons. The castle was turned into an orphanage.

During the second World War the nobleman member of the family Farkas de Boldogfa, Endre Farkas de Boldogfa, Major of the General Staff of the Hungarian royal army and his wife Ms. Klára Lenz, were landwoners on Tiszadob (1,154 hectares belonged to Tiszadob, 422 belonged to Kesznyéten); the manor of Tiszadob was bought by Klára Lenz's father, József Lenz, commercial adviser, landowner in Nyékládház, wholesaler from the Count Sándor Andrássy. Józaef Lenz gave the lands of Tiszadob as a gift to his daughter and son-in-law. József Lenz also bought 935 cadastral moons for himself from Count Sándor Andrássy in Kesznyét, which belongs to Tiszadob. In his free time, Endre Farkas and his relatives and friends used to travel to Tiszadob for deer hunting. By the end of the Second World War, Klára Lenz retired to her mansion in Tiszadob from Budapest, where she gave birth to her second-born son in 1944. After the Second World War, the Counts Andrássy were explelled from Tiszadob and lost they property rights over the castle and the lands. The noble family Farkas de Boldogfa suffered the same fate as the Counts Andrássy.

Economy

See also
Andrássy Castle

References 

Populated places in Szabolcs-Szatmár-Bereg County
Andrássy family